The Cubanelle, also known as "Cuban pepper" and "Italian frying pepper", is a variety of sweet pepper of the species Capsicum annuum. When unripe, it is light yellowish-green in color, but will turn bright red if allowed to ripen. Compared to bell peppers it has thinner flesh, is longer, and has a slightly more wrinkled appearance. It is used extensively in the cuisine of Cuba, the Dominican Republic, Haiti, Puerto Rico and Italy.

Cubanelle peppers generally measure between a 100 and a 1000 on the Scoville scale. Most of the cubanelle pepper imports come from the Dominican Republic (where it is called ají cubanela), which is the main exporter of this cultivar.

See also
List of Capsicum cultivars

References

External links
Basic info on Cubanelle peppers
Gardening info on Cubanelle peppers

Chili peppers
Capsicum cultivars